Slayden may refer to:

 Slayden, Mississippi
 Slayden, Tennessee
 James Luther Slayden (1853–1924), American politician
 Jim Lewis Slayden (1941-1995), American astrologer